SS Aud was a  Norwegian steamboat, built in 1907 in Bergen, Norway, by Bergen Mekaniske Verksted for J. Kuhnle, Jr. During World War I, she was stopped and searched on 30 November 1916 by  at  when sailing from Cardiff, Wales, to Lisbon, Portugal, with a load of coal. UB-18′s commanding officer, Claus Lafrenz, declared the cargo contraband and sank the ship after putting the crew in the lifeboats. Captain Andreas Stehen and his men were later picked up by the Spanish steamer , home-ported at Bilbao, Spain, which had also been stopped and searched by UB-18 but released. They returned to Norway unharmed.

In April 1916, the German steamer  posed as the neutral Aud when delivering a cargo of rifles for the Easter Rising in Ireland.

References

Ships built in Bergen
1907 ships
World War I merchant ships of Norway
Maritime incidents in 1916
Steamships of Norway
Ships sunk by German submarines in World War I
World War I shipwrecks in the Atlantic Ocean